is a Japanese video game and hardware development studio that focuses on handheld consoles.  It is based in Kyoto, though they have a secondary branch in Tokyo. Jupiter's motto is “Let’s Play! Let’s Smile!”.

Titles

Super NES
Tamori's Picross
Mario's Super Picross
Picross NP

Game Boy
J-League Big Wave Soccer
Mario's Picross
Nippon Daihyou Team: Eikou no Eleven
Picross 2
Pocket Kyoro-chan
Game Boy Camera

Game Boy Color
Dangun Racer
Pokémon Picross (unreleased)
Pokémon Pinball
Sakura Taisen GB
Sakura Taisen GB2
Super Robot Pinball

Game Boy Advance
Animal Mania
Disney Sports Motocross
Disney's Party
Erementar Gerad: Tozasareshi Uta
Kingdom Hearts: Chain of Memories (in cooperation with Square Enix)
Sonic Pinball Party (in cooperation with Sonic Team)
Pokémon Pinball: Ruby & Sapphire
Wagamama Fairy: Mirumo de Pon! Ougon Maracas no Densetsu

Nintendo DS
Picross 3DLittle Charo travels in English!SpectrobesPicross DSProfessor Kageyama's Maths TrainingSpectrobes: Beyond the PortalsThe World Ends with You (in cooperation with Square Enix)Tinker Bell and the Great FairyNintendo DSi (DSiWare)Don't Cross the LineNintendo 3DSMedarot DualRPG Maker FesTales of the World: Reve UnitiaNintendo 3DS (Nintendo eShop)Picross 3D round 2
Club Nintendo Picross
Club Nintendo Picross Plus
My Nintendo Picross: The Legend of Zelda: Twilight Princess
Picross e
Picross e2
Picross e3
Picross e4
Picross e5
Picross e6
Picross e7
Picross e8
Picross e9
Pictlogica Final Fantasy (in cooperation with Square Enix)
Pokémon Picross
Sanrio Characters Picross

Nintendo Switch (Nintendo eShop)
Picross S
Picross S2
Picross S3
Picross S4
Picross S5
Picross S6
 Picross S7
 Picross S8
 Picross S: Mega Drive & Mark III Edition
 PICROSS X: Picbits vs Uzboross
Kemono Friends Picross
Picross Lord of the Nazarick
Working Zombies

Pokémon mini
Pokémon Pinball mini
Pokémon Puzzle Collection
Pokémon Puzzle Collection vol. 2Pokémon Race miniTogepi's Great AdventurePokémon Breeder mini''

Notes

References

External links
 

Video game companies of Japan
Video game development companies
Video game publishers
Video game companies established in 1992
Japanese companies established in 1992
Companies based in Kyoto